Albert-Eden is a local government area in Auckland, in New Zealand's Auckland Region. It is governed by the Albert-Eden Local Board and Auckland Council, and is located within the council's Albert-Eden-Puketāpapa Ward.

Geography

The area include the suburbs of Greenlane, Epsom, Mt Eden, Balmoral, Sandringham, Kingsland, Morningside, Owairaka, Mount Albert, Waterview and Point Chevalier. It is a high density residential area with strong transport connections.

There are three maunga (volcanic cones) in the local board area:

 Ōwairaka / Te Ahi-kā-a-Rakataura / Mount Albert
 Maungawhau / Mount Eden
 Te Kōpuke / Tītīkōpuke / Mount St John

There are also two main waterways:

 Te Auaunga-Oakley Creek is the longest stream in Auckland City, flowing to Motu Manawa Marine Reserve at Waterview
 Waititiko-Meola Creek, flowing to the Waitematā Harbour at Meola Reef

There are remnants of lava flow forests at Withiel and Almorah in Epsom, and at Gribblehirst in Sandringham.

History

The area has evidence of early Māori settlement, including several pā sites and other intensive development, including excavation on Maungawhau.

Features

There are several town centres in the area. The Mt Eden Town Centre includes art galleries, the Kingsland Town Centre includes a range of bars, and the Sandringham Town Centre includes a range of Indian businesses. There is also a town centre at Mt Albert.

Eden Park hosts a range of international sport.
Pt Chevalier has a range of beaches.

There are also several recreational areas, including the Gribblehirst and Ōwairaka parks.

Highwic, an historic building and garden in Epsom, has been open to the public since 1981.

TheNew Zealand Trotting Hall of Fame was established in 1997, with the first inductees being added in 1998.

References